Parkland is a neighborhood in Louisville, Kentucky, USA.  Its boundaries are 34th Street on the west, West Broadway on the north, Woodland Avenue on the south, and 26th Street on the east.

It was originally called Homestead and was incorporated in 1874. In 1884 the name was changed to Parkland.  The neighborhood was initially a wealthy suburb of Louisville.  A tornado on March 27, 1890 devastated Parkland, and Parkland was annexed by Louisville in 1894.  When rebuilt, part of Parkland was called Little Africa, but many mansions were built in "White Parkland."  Little Africa was demolished in 1948 to make way for several housing projects.

On May 27, 1968, Parkland was the site of race riots.  Two teenagers were killed, and the National Guard occupied Parkland for seven days.  Most businesses and many residents left Parkland after the riots.  The neighborhood has since been the subject of several urban renewal efforts.

As of 2000, the population of Parkland was 4,550 .

In 2015, the former Boxing Commissioner of Pennsylvania, George Bochetto, along with a real estate investor, Jared Weiss, bought Muhammad Ali's childhood home located at 3302 Grand Avenue in the Parkland section of Louisville.  The home has been restored to its original 1950s condition when Ali lived there.  Ali returned to this home in Parkland after his win of Olympic gold in the 1960 Rome Olympics.  In 2016, the home opened as a museum called the Muhammad Ali Childhood Home Museum.  Both Bochetto and Weiss hope that the renovation will help promote further pride and growth in the Parkland section of Louisville.

References

External links
Street map of Parkland
The first of what is hoped will be hundreds of trees planted throughout the Parkland area in the coming years—Louisville.gov September 29, 2013
   Images of Parkland (Louisville, Ky.) in the University of Louisville Libraries Digital Collections
"Parkland: Between Upheavals, Area that Began as Homestead Saw Rise of Little Africa, Business District" — Article by John C. Pillow of The Courier-Journal

Former municipalities in Kentucky
Neighborhoods in Louisville, Kentucky
Local preservation districts in Louisville, Kentucky
Populated places established in 1874
1874 establishments in Kentucky